Paul Andrew Rogers (born 29 September 1973) is an Australian former professional basketball player most known for his 12 seasons in the Australian National Basketball League (NBL). After playing college basketball in the United States for Gonzaga, he was drafted in the 1997 NBA draft by the Los Angeles Lakers but never played an NBA game. In 2000, he was named NBL MVP and helped the Perth Wildcats win the NBL championship. He won his second NBL championship, also with the Wildcats, in 2010.

Early life
Rogers was born in Adelaide, South Australia.

Basketball career
Rogers debuted in the National Basketball League (NBL) for the Adelaide 36ers in 1992. He played 10 games over two seasons with the 36ers. Between 1992 and 1994, he also played in the Continental Basketball Association (CBA) for the Adelaide Buffalos.

In 1993, Rogers moved to the United States to play college basketball for North Idaho College. In 1994, he transferred to Gonzaga. He was a first-team All-West Coast Conference selection as a junior in 1995–96 and a leading pre-season candidate for WCC Player of the Year in 1996–97 before breaking his foot early in the season. He was drafted in the 1997 NBA draft by the Los Angeles Lakers. He never played for the Lakers, with the team renouncing his rights in January 1999.

For the 1997–98 season, Rogers played in Spain for Real Madrid.

Rogers returned to Australia for the 1998–99 NBL season, joining the Perth Wildcats. In February 1999, he signed with the Toronto Raptors. He did not make his NBA debut due to a broken leg and fractured right ankle. He returned to Perth for the 1999–2000 NBL season, going on to be named league MVP and helping the Wildcats win the NBL championship. After four seasons, he returned to the Adelaide 36ers on a five-year contract in 2002.

Rogers returned to Spain in 2003, playing the next two seasons for Casademont Girona.

Rogers returned to the Perth Wildcats in 2005. He was named captain of the Wildcats for the 2006–07 NBL season. Rogers was restricted to two matches in the 2008–09 NBL season due to a knee injury and a ruptured disc in his back that required surgery. In October 2009, he suffered a torn triceps and then an infected elbow, which ruled him out for the rest of the 2009–10 NBL season. In March 2010, he retired from the NBL after the Wildcats won the championship. He had stints in the State Basketball League (SBL) with the Willetton Tigers (2006) and East Perth Eagles (2010).

Rogers was named in the Perth Wildcats 30th and 40th Anniversary teams.

National team
Rogers represented Australia at the 1998 FIBA World Championship in Athens, the 2000 Summer Olympic Games in Sydney, and again at the 2004 Olympics in Athens.

Personal life
Rogers has dual Australian-British nationality.

References

External links
NBL profile (2010)
NBL profile (2007)
NBL profile (2001)
NBL stats
andthefoul.net profile

1973 births
Living people
1998 FIBA World Championship players
Adelaide 36ers players
Australian expatriate basketball people in Spain
Australian expatriate basketball people in the United States
Australian men's basketball players
Basketball players at the 2000 Summer Olympics
Basketball players at the 2004 Summer Olympics
Basketball players at the 2006 Commonwealth Games
CB Girona players
Centers (basketball)
Commonwealth Games gold medallists for Australia
Commonwealth Games medallists in basketball
Gonzaga Bulldogs men's basketball players
Junior college men's basketball players in the United States
Liga ACB players
Los Angeles Lakers draft picks
Olympic basketball players of Australia
Perth Wildcats players
Real Madrid Baloncesto players
Basketball players from Adelaide
Medallists at the 2006 Commonwealth Games